The Treponemataceae are a family of spirochete bacteria. The clade includes a number of significant pathogens, such as Treponema pallidum, the cause of human syphilis.

References

Spirochaetes
Gram-negative bacteria
Bacteria families